Hasee is also a type of creature in the virtual pet game Neopets.

Hasee Computer Company, Ltd. is a Chinese personal computer manufacturer headquartered in Shenzhen, Guangdong, China. In 2008 it was the second largest Chinese computer maker.

In addition to its domestic market, Hasee products are sold worldwide.

Products
Products include no frills systems sold at low prices. In 2003, some of its desktop models were referred to as "among the cheapest on the [Chinese] market," and in 2008 a Hasee laptop could be purchased for little more than US$370. C. 2010, Hasee calls some of its products "competitively priced,"

Hasee's products include laptops, desktops, smartphones, tablets, and panel PCs. In the mid-2000s, Hasee manufactured its own motherboards, and in 2010 the company states motherboard manufacture continues.

Operations

Subsidiaries
Hasee's subsidiaries include Shenzhen Hasee Computer Co Ltd, Shenzhen Paradise Science and Technology Co Ltd, Shenzhen Hass IC Co Ltd, Shenzhen Creative Science and Technology Co Ltd, Hasee Electronics Fty, and Shenzhen Paradise Advertisement Co Ltd.

Production bases and facilities
Facilities include 230,000 sq meters in Hasee Industrial Park located in Bantian, Shenzhen, and the total floor-space of all Hasee facilities was estimated to be 400,000 sq meters in 2004.

Production bases, as of 2004, include a site in Longgang, Shenzhen.

See also
White box (computer hardware)

References

External links 
Shenzen Hasee Computer Official Website
Hasee Computers official (Hasee Europe with online shops)

Computer companies of China
Computer hardware companies
Manufacturing companies based in Shenzhen
Computer companies established in 1995
Chinese brands